KHPK-LD, virtual channel  28 (VHF digital channel 10), is a low-powered BeIN Sports Xtra-affiliated television station licensed to DeSoto, Texas, United States and serving the Dallas–Fort Worth Metroplex. The station is owned by Innovate Corp. It is not available on Charter Spectrum or FiOS from Frontier at this time.

History

The station began as an independent station with the callsign K69BS on channel 69, then in 2003, it has moved its broadcasts to channel 28 and was rebranded as K28HU. In less than a month, the call letters were once again changed to KHPK named after the three principal owners (Investors) Ric Halden, Marc Pace, and Ron Knott) and it became an Urban America Television network affiliate, because these three owners were shareholders in Urban (UATV). The format was similar to Pax TV's (now Ion Television) format. KHPK aired the UATV signal 24 hours a day and was programmed and designed by Fred Hutton (of American Independent Network). After UATV ceased operations on 1 May 2006 due to lack of necessary resources, KHPK became a temporary repeater for former Almavision affiliate KNAV-LP. However, when the Genesis Television Network was launched, it gave both stations a window of opportunity. KNAV aired Genesis's Spanish broadcast, and KHPK showed the same network's English broadcast.

When K31GL switched from analog to digital broadcasting in November, 2008, Genesis moved from KHPK and KNAV to K31GL, and KHPK began broadcasting K31GL's former infomercial format. In January 2009, KHPK began broadcasting a directional digital signal towards Dallas on channel 3. The infomercials which had moved from K31GL to KHPK moved yet again to KNAV. KHPK's analog channel 28 began broadcasting Spanish religious programming from RedADvenir.org.

On 13 March 2009, DT2 became an AMGTV affiliate. Later, AMGTV moved to K31GL-D, then to KATA-CD3, before being dropped entirely.

In August 2010, KHPK-LD performed a digital flash-cut to channel 28.

In June 2013, KHPK-LD was slated to be sold to Landover 5 LLC as part of a larger deal involving 51 other low-power television stations; the sale fell through in June 2016. Mako Communications sold its stations, including KHPK-LD, to HC2 Holdings in 2017.

In August 2017, KHPK-LD moved from UHF channel 28, to VHF channel 10, before going silent in October 2018.

On 20 June 2019, KHPK-LD returned to the airwaves, broadcasting content from other Dallas/Fort Worth stations operated by HC2 Holdings that shut down their transmitters as a part of the broadcast frequency repacking process following the 2016-2017 FCC incentive auction.

Digital television
This station's digital signal is multiplexed:

References

External links

UANetwork
LATV

Television stations in Texas
Television channels and stations established in 1978
Low-power television stations in the United States
1978 establishments in Texas